Otto Rost (16 June 1887 – 25 June 1970) was a German sculptor. His work was part of the sculpture event in the art competition at the 1936 Summer Olympics.

References

1887 births
1970 deaths
20th-century German sculptors
20th-century German male artists
German male sculptors
Olympic competitors in art competitions
People from Döbeln